Mals or MALS may refer to:
 Mals or Malles Venosta, a comune (municipality) in South Tyrol in northern Italy
 Mäls, a village of Liechtenstein
 Mals (unit), Korean units of volume
 Master of Arts in Liberal Studies, a degree program
 Miwatj Aboriginal legal Service, now merged into the North Australian Aboriginal Justice Agency
 Median arcuate ligament syndrome, an abnormal tightening of the median arcuate ligament under the diaphragm on the posterior abdominal wall
 Mitsubishi Air Lubrication System, a system to reduce ship's drag 
 Multiangle light scattering, a technique for determining physical properties of molecules in solution

See also
 Mal (disambiguation)
 Mall (disambiguation)